The Gate of China can refer to:

 Gate of China, Nanjing, the southern gateway to the city of Nanjing.
 Gate of China, Beijing, the former southern gateway to the imperial city in Beijing.

See also
China Gate (disambiguation)